Appalachian Outlaws is an American reality television series that focuses on the activities of ginseng harvesters in the forests surrounding the Appalachian Mountains. The series was partially scripted. The series premiered on January 9, 2014, on History.

Series overview

Episodes

Season 1 (2014)

Season 2 (2015)

References

External links
 

2010s American reality television series
2014 American television series debuts
2015 American television series endings
History (American TV channel) original programming